María Corbera (born 20 November 1991) is a Spanish sprint canoeist.

She competed at the 2021 ICF Canoe Sprint World Championships, winning a gold medal in the C-2 200 m distance. On August 19, 2022, she won the race of 1500 m C1 in Munich of the European Championships.

References

External links

1991 births
Living people
Spanish female canoeists
ICF Canoe Sprint World Championships medalists in Canadian
21st-century Spanish women